Obi is a town and local government area in Benue State, Nigeria.

References

Local Government Areas in Benue State